Sergey Grigoryev may refer to:

 Sergei Konstantinovich Grigoryev (born 1956), Russian football coach
 Sergey Grigoryev (pole vaulter) (born 1992), Kazakhstani athlete 
 Sergey Grigoryev (racewalker) (born 1937), Soviet athlete